The Madni Surahs (Surah Madaniyah) or Madani chapters of the Quran are the latest 28 Surahs that, according to Islamic tradition, were revealed at Medina after Muhammad's hijrah from Mecca. The community was larger and more developed, as opposed to their minority position in Mecca.

The Medinan Surahs occur mostly at the beginning and in the middle of the Qur'an (but are said to be the last revealed surahs chronologically), and typically have more and longer ayat (verses). Due to the new circumstances of the early Muslim community in Medina, these surahs more often deal with details of moral principles, legislation, warfare (as in Surah 2, al-Baqara), and principles for constituting and the community. They also refer more often to the community with "O people!" and at times directly address Muhammad or speak of him as "an agent acting in combination with the divine persona: 'God and his messenger' (Q 33:22)."

The division of surahs into 'Meccan surahs' and 'Medinan surahs' is primarily a consequence of stylistic and thematic considerations, which Theodor Noldeke used to develop his famous chronology of the Qur'anic suras. Classification of the surahs into these periods is based upon factors such as the length of the verse and the presence or absence of certain key concepts or word (e.g. al-Rahman as name of God).

Characteristics of Medinan surahs
Following are some of the stylistic and subject characteristics of Medinan Surahs:
 Mention of 'Jihad' and detailing on its rulings.
 Details of Islamic jurisprudence and legal system as well as laws governing family, money transaction, international law and acts of worship
 Mention of 'Munafiq' and dealing with hypocrites.
 Any verse that starts with يا أيها للذين آمنوا O you who believe
 Long verses
 Easy vocabulary
 Discussion in regards to the People of the Book

The Medinan phase 
The Medinan phase lasted approximately 10 years. The phase began from Muhammad's hijrah to Madina; and ended at the death of Muhammad. While the themes of the Meccan surahs remain, the Muslims growing into more of a community and the formation of Ummah, now is clear.

Chronological order of Medinan surahs 
Theodor Nöldeke (later known as the Nöldeke-Schwally chronology) proposed a chronological order, consisting of 26 chapters, as follows:
2, 3, 4, 5, 8, 9, 22, 24, 33, 47,
48, 49, 55, 57, 58, 59, 60, 61,
62, 63, 64, 65, 66, 76, 98, 110

See also
 Meccan surah
 List of chapters in the Quran

References

 
Asbab al-nuzul
Medina

Madani surahs are revealed after hijra